Amalya Lyle Kearse (born June 11, 1937) is a senior United States circuit judge of the United States Court of Appeals for the Second Circuit and a world-class bridge player.

Education and legal career

Kearse was born in Vauxhall, New Jersey. Her parents were physician Myra Lyle Smith Kearse of Lynchburg, Virginia, and postmaster Robert Freeman Kearse; her maternal grandparents were schoolteachers Clara Roberta Alexander Smith and Theodore Parker Smith. She attended Columbia High School in Maplewood, New Jersey. A philosophy major and 1959 graduate of Wellesley College with a Bachelor of Arts degree, she was the only black woman in her law school class at the University of Michigan Law School. She was an editor of the law review and graduated with a Juris Doctor cum laude in 1962. She entered private practice in New York City and rose to become a partner in the respected Wall Street firm of Hughes Hubbard & Reed. She was an adjunct lecturer at New York University Law School from 1968 to 1969.

Federal judicial service

Kearse was nominated by President Jimmy Carter on May 3, 1979, to the United States Court of Appeals for the Second Circuit, to a new seat authorized by 92 Stat. 1629. She was confirmed by the United States Senate on June 19, 1979, and received her commission on June 21, 1979. At the time, she was the first woman and only the second black person (after Thurgood Marshall) on the court. She assumed senior status on June 11, 2002.

Kearse was the author of the 1984 decision McCray v. Abrams, a case in which she developed a test that made it much harder for jurors to be struck because of their race. The Supreme Court would develop a test similar to Kearse's in Batson v. Kentucky.

Supreme Court Shortlist

In 1981, Kearse became the first African-American woman to be shortlisted for an appointment as an Associate Justice of the Supreme Court of the United States; President Ronald Reagan eventually nominated Sandra Day O'Connor for the position instead.

Consideration for United States Attorney General

In 1993, Kearse was considered by President Bill Clinton for appointment as United States Attorney General; the job eventually went to Janet Reno.

Bridge career

Kearse is also known as a world-class bridge player. In 1986, playing with longtime partner Jacqui Mitchell, she won the World Women Pairs Championship, which earned her the title of World Bridge Federation World Life Master. She is also a seven-time U.S. national champion of the game.

Honors

 ACBL Hall of Fame, Blackwood Award 2004

Awards

 Charles H. Goren Award (Personality of the Year) 1980

Wins

 World Women's Pairs (1) 1986
 North American Bridge Championships (6)
 Women's Board-a-Match Teams (1) 1990
 Women's Knockout Teams (1) 1987
 Women's Swiss Teams (1) 1991
 Life Master Women's Pairs (1) 1972
 Women's Pairs (2) 1971, 2004
 United States Bridge Championships (1)
 Women's Team Trials (1) 1992

Runners-up

 North American Bridge Championships (3)
 Mixed Board-a-Match Teams (1) 1996
 Women's Knockout Teams (1) 1991
 Women's Swiss Teams (1) 2001
 United States Bridge Championships (3)
 Women's Team Trials (3) 1988, 1995, 2004
 Other notable 2nd places:
 IOC Grand Prix Women's Teams (1) 2002

Publications

See also
Bill Clinton Supreme Court candidates
T. Parker Smith her grandfather a pioneer in African American post secondary education.
List of African-American federal judges
List of African-American jurists
List of first women lawyers and judges in the United States

References

External links
 
 
 
 
 

1937 births
Living people
20th-century American judges
African-American judges
American contract bridge players
Columbia High School (New Jersey) alumni
Judges of the United States Court of Appeals for the Second Circuit
People from Essex County, New Jersey
People from Union Township, Union County, New Jersey
United States court of appeals judges appointed by Jimmy Carter
University of Michigan Law School alumni
Wellesley College alumni
20th-century American women judges
New York (state) Republicans